A charity supergroup is a music group comprising famous musicians or other celebrities which is formed to raise funds or awareness for charities or causes. The supergroup is usually together only for a single album, performance, or single.

The concept dates back to at least 1971 when George Harrison and Ravi Shankar organized The Concert for Bangladesh, and a subsequent album and film, to support UNICEF relief efforts in that country. In the 1980s forming a one-off supergroup to record a charity single became a popular way of promoting a current cause, following Band Aid's "Do They Know Its Christmas?" and USA for Africa's "We Are the World" which were recorded to support famine relief in Ethiopia in 1984 and 1985 respectively.

List of notable charity supergroups

See also
Supergroup (music)
Charity record
Band Aid
USA for Africa

References

Benefit concerts